Amanda Coetzer (born 22 October 1971, in Hoopstad) is a South African former professional tennis player. Coetzer finished in the WTA rankings top 20 for ten consecutive seasons (1992–2001), peaking at world No. 3. She reached three Grand Slam semifinals (Australian Open 1996 and 1997, French Open 1997) and one Grand Slam doubles final (US Open 1993). Coetzer earned a reputation for regularly beating players who were ranked higher than her. By virtue of scoring so many upset wins in spite of her five-foot-two (1.58m) stature, she gained the nickname: "The Little Assassin".

Personal life
Coetzer was born in Hoopstad, South Africa, to Nico and Suska Coetzer. She started playing tennis at the age of six. During her career, she resided primarily in Hilton Head, South Carolina and was coached by Gavin Hopper, later by Lori McNeil. As a photographer's model she appeared as a Sunshine Girl in the Canadian Sun newspaper chain. She is married to the Hollywood film producer Arnon Milchan. They have two children, Shimon (born 2009) and Olivia (born 2011).

Career
Coetzer's breakthrough year was in 1992. She beat world No. 3, Gabriela Sabatini, in Boca Raton, and Jennifer Capriati at the Italian Open, entering into the top 20 in August.

In 1993, Coetzer won her first WTA Tour title in Melbourne, defeating Naoko Sawamatsu in the final, and reached the final of the US Open women's doubles with Inés Gorrochategui.

At the Canada Masters in 1995, Coetzer defeated three players ranked in the world's top 5 – Steffi Graf (No. 1), Jana Novotná (No. 4) and Mary Pierce (No. 5) – before finally losing to Monica Seles in the final. The defeat of Graf ended a 32-match winning-streak for the German. At the end of the year, Coetzer was awarded the WTA Karen Krantzcke Sportsmanship Award (voted for by other players).

At the Australian Open in 1996, Coetzer became the first South African woman in the Open Era to reach a Grand Slam semifinal, where she lost in three sets to Anke Huber.

In 1997, she reached the Australian Open semifinals for the second consecutive year, defeating world No. 1, Steffi Graf, in the fourth round. She beat Graf for a second time that year at the German Open in May (inflicting Graf's worst-ever loss: 6–0, 6–1 in just 56 minutes), and then, in the quarterfinals of the French Open, she defeated Graf yet again to become one of only four to defeat her more than once in Grand Slam matches. Coetzer lost in the French Open semifinals to eventual champion Iva Majoli. She broke into the top 10 in June and top 5 in August, and in Leipzig Coetzer beat Martina Hingis, who by then had taken over the world No. 1 ranking. Coetzer won two singles titles that year – in Budapest and Luxembourg, reached 15 semifinals (or better) in total and was awarded the Karen Krantzcke Sportsmanship Award for a second time, the Most Improved Player and Diamond Aces awards (all WTA).

Coetzer won the biggest title of her career in 1998, at the Charleston Open. She also beat Conchita Martinez on her way to a third quarterfinals showing at the US Open.

In 1999, Coetzer defeated world No. 1, Lindsay Davenport, and world No. 4, Monica Seles, on her way to the final of Tokyo, thereby becoming the only player to ever defeat Graf, Hingis and Davenport while they were ranked number one.

Coetzer teamed-up with Wayne Ferreira to win the 2000 Hopman Cup for South Africa. She beat world No. 3, Venus Williams, in Hamburg and also reached the final of the German Open in Berlin.

In 2001, she qualified for her ninth consecutive Year-end championships, and finished her tenth consecutive season in the world's top 20.

Coetzer retired in 2004. Overall, she won 18 WTA tournament titles, nine in singles and nine in doubles. Her final singles title was won in Acapulco in 2003, and her career prize-money earnings totalled $6 million.

Grand Slam finals

Doubles: 1 runner–up

WTA career finals

Singles: 21 (9 titles, 12 runner-ups)

Doubles: 23 (9 titles, 14 runner-ups)

Grand Slam singles performance timeline

Best Grand Slam results details

Wins over top 10 players

References

External links

 
 
 
 
 

South African female tennis players
Olympic tennis players of South Africa
Tennis players at the 1992 Summer Olympics
People from Tswelopele Local Municipality
Tennis players at the 1996 Summer Olympics
Tennis players at the 2000 Summer Olympics
1971 births
Living people
White South African people
Hopman Cup competitors